The Talachulitna River is a river in Alaska.

There are also:
Talachulitna Creek	at 	Elevation: 
Talachulitna Lake at  Elevation:

History
Tanaina Indian name spelled "Tu-lu-shu-lit-na" by Lt. J. S. Herron, USA, in 1899.

Watershed
Heads on Beluga Mountain, flows South and North-West  to Skwentna River,  North-West of Tyonek, Alaska.

This river begins at Judd Lake.  It is inaccessible by road.  And, it has its own support group.

The Talachulitna is popular for fly-in rafting and fishing trips.  There are special restrictions on fishing: rainbow trout & steelhead are "catch & release" only and only single-hook lures can be used.

More information is available from a log of a 1976 river resource study for the Alaska State Division of Lands.

Tributaries
 Talachulitna Creek

See also
List of rivers of Alaska

References

Rivers of Matanuska-Susitna Borough, Alaska
Rivers of Alaska